AAWT may refer to:

American Association of Woodturners 
Australian Alps Walking Track
 Annual Average Weekday Traffic, a measure of Annual average daily traffic
 
Aland Advanced Water Technology